Wham! was a British pop music duo.

Wham may also refer to:

Places
 Wham, North Yorkshire, England, a hamlet in the Yorkshire Dales, United Kingdom
 Wham, Louisiana, an unincorporated community, United States

Stations
 WHAM (AM), a talk radio station in Rochester, New York
 WHAM-TV, the ABC television affiliate in Rochester, New York

Other uses
 Wham! (comic), a British comic of the 1960s
 Whaam!, a Roy Lichtenstein painting
 Wham Stadium, home ground of Accrington Stanley F.C.
 Whole Health Action Management, a peer-led intervention to facilitate self-management to reach health goals
 Winning hearts and minds
 Wisconsin H-Alpha Mapper, a telescope at the Cerro Tololo Inter-American Observatory
 Women's Health Action and Mobilization, an activist organization based in New York City
 Wham!, a UK music programme by Jack Good, started in 1960
 "Wham!", a song by Lonnie Mack from The Wham of that Memphis Man

People with the surname
 D. Wham, a member of the Thornliebank F.C. 1879–80 Scottish Cup final team
 Carol Wham, New Zealand scientist
Dottie Wham (1925–2019), American politician
 Fred Louis Wham (1884–1967), United States federal judge
 Robert Wham (1926–2011), American lawyer and politician
 Tom Wham (American football) (1924–2006), American National Football League player
 Tom Wham (born 1944), American board game designer

See also
 WAM (disambiguation)
 Wham Bar, a sugary chew bar made in the United Kingdom by Tangerine Confectionery
 Wham-O, a toy company